"Hurt Feelings" is the first single from I Told You I Was Freaky, the second album from Flight of the Conchords. The song was released digitally through iTunes on February 2, 2009, after the song premiered on the television series, Flight of the Concords, on the previous night.

"Hurt Feelings" is a rap song in which Bret McKenzie and Jemaine Clement describe occasions on which they experienced hurt feelings. The accompanying music video includes a shot in which McKenzie and Clement are dressed as Mozart. An alternative version of "Hurt Feelings" (the reprise) featuring Murray, Mel, Doug, Greg, and Clement (with McKenzie doing background vocals) in which they hurtfully describe slights made against them by other characters in the episode.

Charts

References

2009 singles
2009 songs
Flight of the Conchords songs
Songs written by Bret McKenzie
Songs written by Jemaine Clement